Scoparia spinata is a moth in the family Crambidae. It was described by Inoue in 1982. It is found in Japan, China (Hebei, Henan, Hunan, Sichuan, Yunnan, Zhejiang) and Thailand.

References

Moths described in 1982
Scorparia